Jack Nash (April 10, 1929 – July 30, 2008) was a German-born American businessman and investor. He was president of Oppenheimer & Company and founded The New York Sun newspaper.

Early life and education
On April 10, 1929, Nash was born in Berlin as Jack Nachtgeistin to Jewish parents. It is a family story that as a child, during a Nazi rally, he would not give the one-arm salute that demonstrated loyalty to the Reich. The family would later flee Nazi Germany prior to the onset of World War II.  Nash and his sister were sent to a Swiss boarding school by their parents for their own safety before later immigrating to the United States. There he attended Stuyvesant High School in Manhattan, New York, and graduated from City College of New York in 1953.

Investment career
Nash joined Oppenheimer & Company in 1951 and became its president in 1974. He was elected chairman in 1979. In 1982, he and business partner Leon Levy sold the company for $163 million, investing $50 million to start the hedge fund, Odyssey Partners. Nash was also a founder of The New York Sun and served as vice chairman of the board of the American Stock Exchange in the late 1970s.

Personal life
Nash married Helen Englander in 1957, sister of billionaire investor Israel Englander. He and his wife donated millions to Jewish and other cultural and social charities. Although not Orthodox himself, Nash served as chairman of the Aleph Society, dedicated to promoting the works of Rabbi Adin Steinsaltz. Helen Nash has authored a line of kosher cookery books. They had two children, Joshua and Pamela, and six grandchildren.

Nash died on July 30, 2008, after a long illness, at Mount Sinai Medical Center.

Legacy and awards 
In 2008, he was inducted into Institutional Investors Alpha's Hedge Fund Manager Hall of Fame along with Alfred Jones, Bruce Kovner, David Swensen, George Soros, James Simons, Julian Roberston, Kenneth Griffin, Leon Levy, Louis Bacon, Michael Steinhardt, Paul Tudor Jones, Seth Klarman and Steven A. Cohen.

See also 
 List of City College of New York alumni

References

1929 births
2008 deaths
American financiers
American hedge fund managers
American investors
American money managers
American newspaper publishers (people)
Businesspeople from New York City
City College of New York alumni
Jewish emigrants from Nazi Germany to the United States
Presidents of the New York Stock Exchange
Stuyvesant High School alumni
Journalists from New York City
20th-century American businesspeople